The National University of Tucumán (UNT) is an Argentine national university located in Tucumán Province and the largest in Argentina's northwest region. Founded on 25 May 1914 in San Miguel de Tucumán, access to the university is unrestricted and free of charge.

Organization
The university comprises 13 schools, 7 high schools, and 3 museums.

Schools
 Facultad de Agronomía y Zootecnia (School of Agronomy and Zootechnics)
 Facultad de Arquitectura y Urbanismo (School of Architecture and Urbanism)
 Facultad de Artes (School of Arts)
 Facultad de Bioquímica, Química y Farmacia (School of Biochemistry, Chemistry and Pharmacy)
 Facultad de Ciencias Económicas (School of Economics)
 Facultad de Ciencias Exactas y Tecnología (School of Exact Sciences and Technology)
 Facultad de Ciencias Naturales (School of Natural Science)
 Facultad de Derecho y Ciencias Sociales (School of Law and Social Science)
 Facultad de Educación Física (School of Physical Education)
 Facultad de Filosofía y Letras (School of Philosophy and Letters)
 Facultad de Medicina (School of Medicine)
 Facultad de Odontología (School of Dentistry)
 Facultad de Psicología (School of Psychology)

High schools
 Escuela de Agricultura y Sacarotecnia (School of Agriculture)
 Escuela de Bellas Artes (School of Fine Art)
 Escuela y Liceo Vocacional Sarmiento (School and Vocational Lyceum Sarmiento)
 Instituto Superior de Música (Superior Institute of Music)
 Gymnasium de la Universidad Nacional de Tucumán (Gymnasium of the National University of Tucumán)
 Instituto Técnico (Technical Institute)
 Instituto Técnico de Aguilares (Technical Institute of Aguilares)

Museums
 Instituto de Arqueología y Museo (Institute and Museum of Archaeology)
 Museo de la Universidad Nacional de Tucumán (Museum of the National University of Tucumán)
 Museo Miguel Lillo de Ciencias Naturales (Museum of Natural Science Miguel Lillo)

Notable alumni

Katharina Beck (born 1982), politician
Cástulo Guerra (born 1945), actor
Leda Valladares (1919-2012), composer
César Pelli (1926-2019), architect

See also
Argentine university reform of 1918
List of Argentine universities
Science and technology in Argentina

External links

 Official website
Science and Education in Argentina
Argentine Higher Education Official Site

1914 establishments in Argentina
Tucuman
Educational institutions established in 1914
National universities
Buildings and structures in San Miguel de Tucumán
Universities in Tucumán Province